Dios es Bueno is the twenty-ninth album released by Marcos Witt. This album was recorded live in Puerto Rico. It also included a DVD which contains four music videos . This album was winner of the Latin Grammy and Billboard Music Award in the category of Best Christian album.

Track listing
"Intro De Niños" - 00:52
"Mi Anhelo" (Marcos Witt) - 03:07
"¡Vengan Todos!" (Marcos Witt) - 03:37
"El Gozo Del Señor" (Marcos Witt) - 04:24
"Tengo Libertad" (Marcos Witt) - 05:23
"A Ti Sea La Gloria" (Coalo Zamorano) - 04:33
"¡Gloria!" (Edna Lorena Gil Porras) - 07:42
"Es Por Tú Amor" (Alex Campos) - 06:59
"Tú Eres Fiel" (Marcos Witt) - 05:24
"Rey De Gloria" (Néstor Delgado, Arnoldo Ramirez) - 11:11
"En Los Montes, En Los Valles" (Feat. Funky) (Emmanuel Espinosa, Juan Salinas) - 05:26
"Dios Ha Sido Bueno" (Marcos Witt) - 07:18

DVD

 En Los Montes, En Los Valles
 Jesús Es El Señor
 Santa La Noche
 Gracias

Personnel 
Nashville String Machine - strings
Marcos Witt - piano, producer, liner notes
Derrick Horne - arranger
Juan Salinas - guitar, assistant, producer
Milton Sesenton - arranger
Dick Tunney - string director
Sergio González - arranger
James Hernández - trombone, arranger
Junior Alvarado - Bass
Gustavo López - trumpet
Tony Rijos - guitar
Eliud Velázquez - percussion
Wiso Aponte - guitar
Orlando Rodriguez - engineer, mixing
Coalo Zamorano - chorus, mixing
Hector "Perucho" Rivera - arranger, keyboards
Lucy Esquilin - chorus
Vanyo Esquilin - chorus
Steven Monárrez - arranger, keyboard and synths on: "Tú Eres Fiel"
Holger Fath - arranger
Ismael Rivera - drums

Awards

In 2006, the album was nominated for a Dove Award for Spanish Album of the Year at the 37th GMA Dove Awards.

References

2005 live albums
2005 video albums
Live video albums
Marcos Witt live albums
Marcos Witt video albums
Latin Grammy Award for Best Christian Album (Spanish Language)